A Murderous Girl is a 1927 German silent thriller film directed by Sidney Morgan and starring Cilly Feindt, Werner Pittschau and Harry Hardt.

The film's sets were designed by the art director Gustav A. Knauer.

Cast
Cilly Feindt
Werner Pittschau
Harry Hardt
Erich Kaiser-Titz
Karl Platen
Alexander Murski
Nina Vanna
Franz Klebusch
Franz Verdier
Hans Sternberg
Paul Conradi

References

External links

1920s thriller films
Films of the Weimar Republic
German silent feature films
German thriller films
Films directed by Sidney Morgan
German black-and-white films
Silent thriller films
1920s German films